Gerald Hill may refer to:

 Gerald Hill (cricketer), (19132006), English cricketer
Gerald Hill (politician)
Gerald Hill (American football) on List of Houston Cougars in the NFL Draft
Gerald Hill (attorney) in California Democratic Council

See also 
 Gerald Hills (active from 1990), American politician and educator
 Jerry Hill (disambiguation)
 Gerald Rowland Clegg-Hill, 7th Viscount Hill (19041974), British peer
 Hill (surname)